Peter or Petrus was the reputed son of Munichis and brother of one Ursus. Paul the Deacon records that Munichis died in the same battle as Ferdulf, Duke of Friuli, and that his son Peter and Ursus later became dukes of Friuli and Benevento respectively. The date of Peter's reign is unknown, but has been hypothesised as following that of Aistulf or Anselm in 756 or 751 and lasted until the Siege of Pavia.

Sources
Paul the Deacon. Historia Langobardorum.

8th-century births
8th-century deaths
Dukes of Friuli
8th-century Lombard people
8th-century rulers in Europe